Hofgeismar is a railway station located in Hofgeismar, Germany. The station is located on the Kassel–Warburg railway. The train services are operated by Deutsche Bahn, abellio Deutschland and RegioTram Gesellschaft.

Train services 
The following services currently call at the station:

Regional services  RRX Düsseldorf - Hamm - Lippstadt - Paderborn - Warburg - Kassel
Regional services  Sauerland-Express Hagen - Bestwig - Brilon Wald - Warburg - Kassel
Tram-train services  Hofgeismar-Hümme - Kassel - City Centre - Hollandische Straße

References

Railway stations in Hesse